Vladimir Portnoy (June 9, 1931 – February 19, 1984) was a Soviet gymnast.  He is Jewish, and was born in Odessa.

Portnoy won a silver medal for the Soviet Union at the 1960 Olympics in Rome in team combined gymnastics.  He won a bronze medal in the long horse at the same Olympics, behind Takashi Ono (gold) and Boris Shakhlin (silver).

See also
List of select Jewish gymnasts

References

1931 births
1984 deaths
Ukrainian male artistic gymnasts
Soviet male artistic gymnasts
Olympic silver medalists for the Soviet Union
Olympic bronze medalists for the Soviet Union
Olympic gymnasts of the Soviet Union
Gymnasts at the 1960 Summer Olympics
Olympic medalists in gymnastics
Jewish gymnasts
Sportspeople from Odesa
Soviet Jews
Ukrainian Jews
Medalists at the 1960 Summer Olympics